Aaravadhu Vanam is a 2010 Indian Tamil language romantic drama film directed by R. Bhuvanesh. The film stars Bhushan, Vidhya Mohan and Bose Venkat, with Ramya, Ansiba Hassan, Scissor Manohar, Mahalingam Pollachi, Porur Sekar and Thangam playing supporting roles. The film, produced by S. M. Thiyagarajan, had musical score by R. Haribabu and was released on 30 July 2010. The film was remade in Malayalam as Bhagavathipuram (2011).

Plot

A few months ago in a remote village named Aaravadhu Vanam, the villagers strongly condemned inter-caste marriages and strictly followed the caste system. The village bigwig Dharma (Bose Venkat) wanted to marry his college-going relative Malar (Vidhya Mohan) whereas the ruffian Puli (Bhushan) who had no family carried out crimes wearing a lion mask. Malar became curious about Puli, she then fell in love with him and she even kissed him one day. One week before her marriage with Dharma, Malar declared her love to Puli and Puli scolded her for being senseless to fall in love with a wastrel with no future. The day of the marriage, she left the wedding hall and went on to meet Puli but Puli brought her back to the wedding hall. Malar's father and his henchmen insulted Puli. Consumed with anger, Puli changed his mind and he swore to marry her. The two ran away from the henchmen, and when they arrived in Chennai, Puli is stuck by a car. Malar admitted him to the hospital in Chennai and Dharma came to support her. Puli was diagnosed with mental illness and Malar took care of her at the hospital, but a year later, Puli vanished.

Back to the present, Dharma is still in love with Malar and wants to marry her at any cost. Dharma was the one who put Puli in a random container lorry and he even corrupted a police officer to declare him as dead. Malar finally accepts to marry Dharma. In the meantime, Puli returns to his village and has a brutal fight with Dharma and his henchmen. Puli is eventually killed by Dharma and Dharma marries Malar the next day as he planned. Just after the marriage, Malar reveals to Dharma that she knows that he has killed her lover and she suddenly dies. Dharma then discovers that all the villagers are dead except him and he finds that their marriage food was poisoned.

After this incident, Dharma became a lunatic and he lived alone in the empty village. The film ends with Dharma dying.

Cast

Bhushan as Puli
Vidhya Mohan as Malar
Bose Venkat as Dharma
Ramya
Ansiba Hassan as Anu
Scissor Manohar as Krish
Mahalingam Pollachi as Mahalingam
Porur Sekar
Thangam as Thangam
Madurai Mohan
Chinrasu
Rajini Mani

Production
R. Bhuvanesh, an erstwhile assistant of directors K. Bhagyaraj and R. Parthiepan, made his directorial debut with Aaravadhu Vanam under the banner of MPG Films International. Kannada actor Bhushan, Vidhya Mohan from Kerala and Bose Venkat were selected to play the lead roles. The story is derived from the Mahabharata in which the sixth forest (Aaravadhu Vanam) was supposed to be the toughest for the Pandavas to go through and the battle was the bloodiest in the whole war when going through this passage. Aaravadhu Vanam is based on a real-life incident about the entire village community vacating their lands for the sake of a young couple in love. Director R. Bhuvanesh wanted to film Aaravadhu Vanam in the same village, but the couple didn't allow them to do so. Without any options left, the crew journeyed across various places and finally nailed down Singaram Palayam located near Coimbatore district. But again, the villagers were infuriated on the plea of filmmaker to vacate their lands for five whole days. As they were explained about the contextual scenario and script, the villagers changed their minds and heeded to their petitions. R. Haribabu, a former assistant to Srikanth Deva, had scored the music.

Soundtrack

The soundtrack was composed by R. Haribabu. The soundtrack, released in 2009, features 6 tracks. A reviewer rated the album 1.5 out of 5 and said, "This album hobbles around Keeravani and Natabhairavi ragas so much so that you get a feeling of déjà vu by the time you come to the fourth song".

References

2010 films
2010s Tamil-language films
Indian romantic drama films
Romantic drama films based on actual events
Films based on the Mahabharata
Tamil films remade in other languages
2010 directorial debut films
2010 romantic drama films